Ignu is a poem written by Allen Ginsberg in 1958.

It describes a specific type of person, called an Ignu, who, among other numerous attributes, "lives only once and eternally and knows it," and "sleeps in everybody's bed."
Ginsberg mentions many of his friends in the poem as examples of Ignus, including William S. Burroughs

References
Ginsberg, Allen. "Ignu," Selected Poems 1947-1995 New York, NY 1996

Poetry by Allen Ginsberg